DracoVirgo is a Japanese band, and formed in 2017.

Career
Three members are the former members of High and Mighty Color, which disbanded in 2010. They formed the new band DracoVirgo on August 23, 2017.

They held their first live, DracoVirgo 1st LIVE TOUR "Opportunity", on February 26, 2018.

Member
MAAKIII, vocalist.

mACKAz, bass.

SASSY, drum.

Discography

Single
Universal Music Japan

As featured artist

References

Universal Music Japan artists
Musical groups established in 2017
2017 establishments in Japan